Bobley Anderson Allegne (born 3 March 1992), is an Ivorian footballer who plays as an attacking midfielder.

Club career
A youth product of the AFAD Djékanou, Anderson was promoted to the club's first team squad in 2010, aged 18. He was part of the team which finished as second in the 2011 Ivorian Ligue 1, and appeared in the following year's CAF Champions League.

On 17 July 2012, Anderson signed a five-year contract with Moroccan club Wydad Casablanca for 200.000 MAD. He appeared regularly for the club, playing in 24 matches and scoring three goals.

On 4 July 2013, Anderson signed a five-year deal with La Liga side Málaga CF. He made his debut in the competition on 17 August, coming on as a second-half substitute in a 0–1 loss at Valencia CF.

On 24 January 2014, Anderson moved to SV Zulte Waregem on loan until June. After appearing sparingly, he returned to the Andalusians in June and moved to AD Alcorcón on 1 September, in the same predicament.

Anderson scored his first goal in Spain on 21 December 2014, in a 1–2 away loss against Sporting de Gijón in the Segunda División championship. On 30 June of the following year he was released by the Andalusians, after his loan ended.

International career
Anderson made his debut for Ivory Coast U23 in January 2012 in a friendly match against Niger.

Club statistics

Honours

Club
AFAD Djékanou
Côte d'Ivoire Ligue 1: 2011 (runner-up)

Individual
Côte d'Ivoire Ligue 1 Best Player: 2011

References

External links
 
 
 

1992 births
Living people
Ivorian footballers
Association football midfielders
Wydad AC players
La Liga players
Segunda División players
Málaga CF players
AD Alcorcón footballers
Belgian Pro League players
S.V. Zulte Waregem players
LB Châteauroux players
Championnat National players
Ivorian expatriate footballers
Ivorian expatriate sportspeople in Spain
Expatriate footballers in Morocco
Expatriate footballers in Spain
Expatriate footballers in Belgium
Expatriate footballers in France
Academie de Foot Amadou Diallo players